The Ambassador Extraordinary and Plenipotentiary of Brazil to Peru is the official representative of the Federative Republic of Brazil to the Republic of Peru.

Relations between both countries were established in 1826, and have continued since.

List of representatives

References

Peru
Brazil